Longueur d'ondes (Wavelength) is the fifth studio album recorded by the Canadian singer Natasha St-Pier, and was released on January 16, 2006. It achieved a great success in France, topping the albums and digital charts, and also in Belgium and Switzerland. The album's lead single, "Un ange frappe à ma porte", was the most-played French single across the world during 2006.

Track listing 

 "Un Ange frappe à ma porte" (single) — 4:08
 "Longueur d’ondes" — 3:54
 "Ce Silence" (feat. Frédéric Château, single) — 3:52
 "J’oublie" — 3:32
 "Tiens-moi à la vie" — 3:35
 "Je peux tout quitter" — 3:33
 "À l’amour comme à la guerre" — 5:22
 "Tant que j’existerai" (single) — 2:58
 "Comme dans un train" — 3:48
 "Je traverserai" — 3:54
 "Je fais comme si" — 3:45
 "De nous" — 3:50
+ "Un Ange frappe à ma porte" (video)

Certifications

Charts

References

2006 albums
Natasha St-Pier albums
Sony Music France albums